Üçkuyular is a light-rail station on the Konak Tram line in İzmir, Turkey. It is located along Mustafa Kemal Coastal Boulevard in west Konak. The station consists of two side platforms, one on each side of the boulevard. Connection to İzdeniz ferry service is available at the Üçkuyular Ferry Terminal.

Üçkuyular station opened on 24 March 2018.

Connections
Üçkuyular Ferry Pier and bus terminus is nearby. Routes 5, 6, 7, 17, 24, 25, 480, 486, 945 terminate in the Üçkuyular Ferry Pier Bus Interchange.

References

Railway stations opened in 2018
2018 establishments in Turkey
Konak District
Tram transport in İzmir